The International Loadstar is a series of trucks that were produced by International Harvester from 1962 to 1978.  The first product line of the company developed specifically as a medium-duty truck, the Loadstar was slotted between C-Line pickup trucks and the heavy-duty R-series.  Following the discontinuation of the R-series, the Loadstar was slotted below the Fleetstar and Transtar conventionals.

Produced primarily as a straight truck, the Loadstar was developed primarily for applications such as local delivery, construction, and agriculture.  Along with fire truck applications, the Loadstar was offered as a "Schoolmaster" cowled school bus chassis.

In 1978, International introduced the medium-duty S-Series, consolidating the Loadstar and Fleetstar into a single model family.

Production and models

International manufactured a complete line of trucks and used few light and medium-duty vendor parts. A conservative company, components had long production runs without model year changes. The Loadstar itself changed very little over its fourteen year production run.  Early models were recognizable by their grey grill and "butterfly" hood, but a one-piece tilting hood was used from model year 1972 onwards.

Loadstar 
Most Loadstars had a medium-duty 4x2 chassis, but 4x4, 6x4, and 6x6 models were also built. A four-door crew cab was also available. The cab, also used on the Fleetstar, had been introduced on the A-series in 1957.

Models included: Binder, 1600, 1700, 1750, 1800, F1800, 1850, and F1850, with the numbers indicating the size and weight rating of the model. The 1750 and 1850 had mid-range diesels. The 1600 and 1700 were available with 4x4, the F1800 and F1850 had tandem rear axles.

Loadstar CO 

The Loadstar CO 1600, 1700, and 1800 were forward control cab-over-engine versions of the Loadstar, built from 1963 until 1970. For 1971, the Loadstar CO became the Cargostar, with a wider cab and larger grille; the model line would be produced through 1986.

Schoolmaster 

The Schoolmaster 1603, 1703, 1803, and 1853 were cowl-chassis models used for school-bus type bodies, the 1853 was also available as a forward control bare chassis for flat-nosed bodies. The Schoolmaster had longer wheelbases available than the Loadstar, otherwise they were mechanically the same.

Design overview

Chassis 
Models other than semi-tractors had vacuum assisted hydraulic drum brakes standard. Air over hydraulic and full air brakes were available. A driven front axle and tandem rear axles were available on some models (cab-over-engine models could have neither).

Engines 
Gasoline, CNG, and mid-range diesel engines were used. The short hood of the Loadstar meant that V-8 engines fit better than straight-six engines.

The V304/345/392 family was the primary engine of the Loadstar between 1962 and 1973. They are  overhead valve gasoline V8s. They developed  respectively. CNG V345s were also available. In 1962 the V304 was standard on the 1600 and 1700 while the V345 was standard on the 1800. On most models the next larger engine was optional. In 1974 the V345 became standard on the 1600.

The MV404 was introduced in 1974. It was a  overhead valve gasoline V8 with a 4-barrel carburetor. It became standard on the 1700 and 1800.

The BD264/282/308 family were the only inline-six cylinder gasoline engines offered.

Driveline 
Four and 5-speed manual transmissions were used.  All gasoline single axle models could have a 2-speed rear axle. Diesel models were available with 8- and 10-speed Roadranger manual transmissions. Four and 6-speed automatic transmissions were available on some models.

Navistar concept (2012)
The Loadstar name was revived in 2012 for a series of heavy duty low-slung cabover trucks, particularly suitable for waste hauling. The Loadstar offered a stainless steel cab, an industry first, making it resistant to the corrosion associated with waste disposal, airplane refueling, and other such fields for which the truck was intended.

Production was scheduled to begin in 2013 but never did.

References

International Truck Specifications - Loadstar (Wisconsin Historical Society)

External links
International Harvester Loadstar (Internet Movie Cars Database)
1977 International Harvester Loadstar 1800 Photo Gallery
 

Loadstar
Navistar International trucks
Vehicles introduced in 1962
Trucks of the United States